Sembanarkoil is a state assembly constituency in Mayiladuthurai district, Tamil Nadu, India. It existed from 1967 to 1971.

Madras state

Election results

1971

1967

References

External links
 

Mayiladuthurai district
Former assembly constituencies of Tamil Nadu